Samuel J. Porcello (May 23, 1935 – May 12, 2012) was an American food scientist who worked at Nabisco for 34 years. He is particularly noted for his work on the modern Oreo cookie. Porcello held five patents directly related to the Oreo. In particular, Porcello was the inventor of the white Oreo cookie creme-filling. His work earned him the nickname, "Mr. Oreo."

Early life
Porcello was born and raised in Newark, New Jersey. He also lived in Wayne, New Jersey. He and his family moved to Toms River, New Jersey, in 1974, where he resided for the rest of his life. Porcello initially worked as a teacher for a short time during his early career. He then worked for the former The Charms Company, a candy manufacturer. He was nearly hired by a major cosmetics company, but his candidacy ended when the company learned that Porcello was color blind.

Career
Porcello joined Nabisco after his rejection by the cosmetics industry because he was color-blind. When he was hired, Nabisco promised that he could eventually earn a salary of up to $12,000 per year if he was successful. He began his Nabisco career at the company's plant in Fair Lawn, New Jersey. He later worked at Nabisco's corporate headquarters in East Hanover, New Jersey.

Porcello joined Nabisco's research and development department, which develops new lines of snacks. He was considered one of the world's leading experts on cocoa, which is used to make chocolate. He was given the title, "principal scientist," during his career at Nabisco. The Oreo cookie, has been sold since 1912 (450 billion Oreos have been sold since their introduction), but it was Porcello who invented the modern creme-filling for Oreos and Double Stuffed Oreos, which have extra filling.

In total, Porcello held five patents related to his work on the Oreo. He also developed a product line of Oreos enrobed in white chocolate and dark chocolate. Porcello found the particular type of chocolate which he used for chocolate-covered Oreos while attending a food industry trade show in Europe.

Aside from his work with the Oreo, Porcello developed other Nabisco snack products, including SnackWells. His position required him to travel extensively in search of new potential products and ingredients. According to his son, Curtis, Porcello often brought new snacks home with him to see how his family liked or disliked the potential new products. Porcello was not a huge eater of Oreo cookies, preferring to eat the cookie without dunking it in milk.

Later life
Porcello left the company as its principal food scientist in 1993 after 34 years. Additionally, he was a longtime volunteer with ACDI/VOCA, for which he helped create a food and program and company in Thailand. Sam Porcello died May 12, 2012, at the age of 76.

References

External links

1935 births
2012 deaths
American food scientists
Nabisco
People from Toms River, New Jersey
People from Newark, New Jersey
People from Wayne, New Jersey